Jamie Wayne Attwell (born 8 June 1982 in Bristol) is an English football goalkeeper. He represented Wales at junior level.

Attwell began his career as a junior with local Bristol sides Shirehampton and St. Vallier, before joining Everton's junior scheme. He failed to settle at Everton and returned to Bristol in March 2001, playing a couple trial games for Bristol City before signing a three-year traineeship with Tottenham Hotspur. He was released by Tottenham after failing to make the grade and had trials with Kidderminster Harriers, Bradford City, Salisbury City and Southend United before joining Bristol City in August 2001 as cover for Steve Phillips and Mike Stowell

He failed to make the first team with City and joined Tiverton Town on loan in March 2002, before being released by City at the end of the season.

In July 2002, Attwell was on trial at Tranmere Rovers, but moved to Torquay United later that month.

He made his league debut in place of the injured Kevin Dearden on 17 August 2002 in a 4–3 defeat away to York City. His next game came on 22 October 2002, a 4–0 defeat in the Football League Trophy at home to Wycombe Wanderers, followed 4 days later by a 5–1 defeat away to Scunthorpe United.

He was dropped after the Scunthorpe game, but on 29 October played in the 4–0 home win against AFC Bournemouth, replacing Dearden as a substitute with the game still at 0-0. He made one further appearance for Torquay, on 19 November, as a half-time substitute for Arjan van Heusden in the 2–2 draw at home to Kidderminster Harriers, a game Torquay were leading 2-0 when he came on, before being released early the following week. He had conceded 15 goals in the equivalent of less than four games.

References

External links

1982 births
Living people
English footballers
Tottenham Hotspur F.C. players
Bristol City F.C. players
Torquay United F.C. players
English Football League players
Association football goalkeepers
Footballers from Bristol